Barry W. Grinter (born 1 October 1951) is a former Australian rules footballer who played with Essendon and Richmond in the Victorian Football League (VFL) during the 1970s.

Grinter played most of his football either as a ruckman or defender. A left-footed player, he was recruited to Essendon from Ararat. From 1974 to 1976, Grinter put together 46 consecutive games and was the runner-up in Essendon's 1975 'Best and Fairest' award. The following year he was the club's equal third best performer in the Brownlow Medal count.

After a season as captain-coach of Hobart in 1977, Grinter resumed his VFL career at Richmond but could only manage six appearances. He went on to coach Queensland Australian Football League (QAFL) club Windsor-Zillmere from 1983 to 1984.

References

1951 births
Essendon Football Club players
Richmond Football Club players
Hobart Football Club players
Hobart Football Club coaches
Ararat Football Club players
Zillmere Eagles Australian Football Club players
Australian rules footballers from Victoria (Australia)
Living people